Gonu Jha was a "Pratyutpannamati" (ready-witted) character and a contemporary of Hari Singh King of Mithila in the 13th century CE. He was born at Bharwara. He is also known as Birbal of Bihar, a village in Darbhanga District. He was a military scholar of Mithila.

See also
 Gopal Bhar
 Tenaliram
 Birbal
 List of people from Bihar

References

People from Bihar
Humour and wit characters of India
13th-century Indian people
People from Darbhanga district